Ust-Yedenga is a rural locality (a settlement) in Pyatovskoye Rural Settlement, Totemsky  District, Vologda Oblast, Russia. The population was 225 as of 2002.

Geography 
Ust-Yedenga is located 5 km southeast of Totma (the district's administrative centre) by road. Tekstilshchiki is the nearest rural locality.

References 

Rural localities in Tarnogsky District